Perichares is a Neotropical genus of skippers in the family Hesperiidae.

Species
Perichares furcata Mabille, 1891 - Brazil
Perichares haworthiana (Swainson, 1821) – green-banded ruby-eye – Panama to south Brazil
Perichares manu Mielke & Casagrande, 2004 - Peru, Brazil
Perichares metallica (Riley, 1921) - Brazil
Perichares philetes (Gmelin, [1790])
Perichares romeroi Mielke & Casagrande, 2004 - Venezuela
Perichares vulpina (C. & R. Felder, 1867) - Colombia

References

Natural History Museum Lepidoptera genus database

Hesperiinae
Hesperiidae genera
Hesperiidae of South America